Saskia Meg Horley (born 23 February 2000) is an Australian cricketer who plays for Scotland, New South Wales and Sydney Thunder. She played in four matches for Sydney Thunder in the 2019–20 Women's Big Bash League season. In 2022, she played for Middlesex in the Women's Twenty20 Cup.

In August 2022, Horley was named in Scotland's squad for their series against Ireland in September 2022. She qualifies for Scotland through her mother, who was born in Edinburgh, and she holds a British passport.

References

2000 births
Living people
Cricketers from Sydney
Australian women cricketers
Australian expatriate sportspeople in England
Scotland women Twenty20 International cricketers
Sydney Thunder (WBBL) cricketers
New South Wales Breakers cricketers
Middlesex women cricketers